Shahrul bin Mohd Saad (born 8 July 1993) is a Malaysian professional footballer who plays as a centre-back for Malaysia Super League club Johor Darul Ta'zim and the Malaysia national team. Shahrul plays mainly as a centre-back but can also plays as a defensive midfielder.

Club career
Shahrul started his career at Perak youth team. He was then transferred to Malaysia national youth setup and has played for Harimau Muda B in the 2011 Malaysia league and Harimau Muda A in the 2012 Singapore S.League. In 2014 he played 22 matches for Harimau Muda in the Australian National Premier Leagues.

In 2015, he graduated from the national youth setup and was signed by Felda United. At Felda, he was converted from a defender to a defensive midfielder by head coach Irfan Bakti Abu Salim. He made his debut in the second match of 2015 Malaysia Super League against Sime Darby coming on from a bench in the 81st minute. He made his first start against Johor Darul Ta'zim on 3 May 2015 and become a regular until the end of the season. His only league goal for Felda was in the final league match against Johor Darul Ta'zim, where Felda won 2-1.

In 2016, Shahrul returned to Perak FC. He won the 2018 Malaysia Cup with Perak and finished as league runners up in 2018, hence qualified to the AFC Champions League play-off round.

On 8 May 2021, Shahrul joined Johor Darul Ta'zim. He was given the number 32 shirt. He made his debut against Sabah in the 2021 Malaysia Cup. He also scored his first goal for Johor Darul Ta'zim in the same competition against Kelantan.

International career
In 2012, Shahrul played his first match for the national under 23 team in the final match of 2012 Olympic qualifiers against Syria. He featured in two Southeast Asian Games (2013 and 2015) and 2014 Asian Games for the Malaysia national under 23 team. He also a part of the 2013 Merdeka Tournament winning team and played for the 2013 Malaysia Universiade team.

Shahrul made his debut for Malaysia national football team in late 2015 by national coach Ong Kim Swee.

Career Statistics

Club

International

International goals
''As of match played 8 June 2022. Malaysia score listed first, score column indicates score after each Shahrul Saad goal.

Personal life
Shahrul has two older brother who also have played professional football, Shahrizal Saad and Syamsul Saad. Like him, both brothers have played for Perak and Malaysia national team. Shahrul even played under Syamsul when his brother was the head coach of Perak in 2016.

Honours

Club
 Perak TBG 
 Malaysia Super League runner-up: 2018
 Malaysia Cup: 2018
 Malaysia FA Cup runner-up: 2019

 Johor Darul Ta'zim

 Malaysia Cup: 2022
 Malaysia Super League: 2021, 2022
 Piala Sumbangsih: 2022
 Malaysia FA Cup: 2022

International
Malaysia U23
 Merdeka Tournament: 2013

Malaysia
 AFF Championship runner-up: 2018

Individual
 Malaysia Football League Best Defender: 2018, 2019

References

External links
 

1993 births
Living people
Malaysian footballers
Malaysia international footballers
People from Perak
Johor Darul Ta'zim F.C. players
Perak F.C. players
Felda United F.C. players
Association football defenders
Association football midfielders
Footballers at the 2014 Asian Games
Asian Games competitors for Malaysia